The Companies (Consolidation) Act 1908 (8 Edw 7 c 69) was an Act of the Parliament of the United Kingdom, which was part of the company law of that country and of the Republic of Ireland.

This Act was one of the Companies Acts 1908 to 1928. This Act was to be construed as one with the Companies Act 1913 (3 & 4 Geo 5 c 25).

The whole Act was repealed by section 381(1) of, and Part I of the Twelfth Schedule to, the Companies Act 1929 (19 & 20 Geo 5 c 23), subject to sections 381(2) and 382 of that Act.

The whole Act was repealed, as to the Republic of Ireland, by section 3(1) of, and the Twelfth Schedule to, the Companies Act, 1963, subject to the savings in section 3 of that Act.

This Act was retained for the Republic of Ireland by section 2(1) of, and Part 4 of Schedule 1 to, the Statute Law Revision Act 2007.

As to companies registered under this Act, see formerly sections 675 to 677 of the Companies Act 1985 and sections 377 to 379 of the Companies Act 1948; and sections 625 to 627 of the Companies (Northern Ireland) Order 1986 (SI 1986/1032) (NI 6).

This Act was amended by section 99 of, and the Second Schedule to the Companies Act 1928 (18 & 19 Geo 5 c 45).

Section 18
Section 18(3) was inserted by section 4(c) of the Companies Act 1928.

Section 26
Section 26(3) was substituted by section 10(1) of the Companies Act 1928.

Section 30
Section 30(3) was substituted by section 9(b) of the Companies Act 1928.

Section 34
This section was substituted by section 10(1) of the Companies Act 1928.

Section 38
The words from "(i) with intent to defraud," to "altered or," in section 38(1) were repealed by section 20 of, and Part 1 of the Schedule to, the Forgery Act 1913.

Section 38(2) was repealed by section 20 of, and Part 1 of the Schedule to, the Forgery Act 1913.

Section 40
This section was repealed by sections 19(3) and 118(3) of, and the Third Schedule to, the Companies Act 1928.

Section 41
Section 41(3) was repealed by sections 12(b) and 118(3) of, and the Third Schedule to, the Companies Act 1928.

Section 42
This section was substituted by section 14 of the Companies Act 1928.

Section 44
Section 44(1A) was inserted by section 15(b) of the Companies Act 1928.

Section 45
This section was repealed by section 118(3) of, and the Third Schedule to, the Companies Act 1928.

Section 48
This section was substituted by section 19(1) of the Companies Act 1928.

Section 56
This section was repealed by section 118(3) of, and the Third Schedule to, the Companies Act 1928.

Section 82
This section was repealed by section 118(3) of, and the Third Schedule to, the Companies Act 1928.

Section 84
Section 84(2) was repealed by section 118(3) of, and the Third Schedule to, the Companies Act 1928.

Section 85
Section 85(7) was repealed by section 118(3) of, and the Third Schedule to, the Companies Act 1928.

Section 109
Section 109(7) was repealed by section 118(3) of, and the Third Schedule to, the Companies Act 1928.

Section 114
This section was repealed by section 118(3) of, and the Third Schedule to, the Companies Act 1928.

Section 119
This section was repealed by section 118(3) of, and the Third Schedule to, the Companies Act 1928.

Section 121
Section 121(2) was repealed by section 118(3) of, and the Third Schedule to, the Companies Act 1928.

Section 131
Section 131(1) to (4) and (8) were repealed by section 118(3) of, and the Third Schedule to, the Companies Act 1928.

Section 151
Section 151(1)(c) was repealed by section 118(3) of, and the Third Schedule to, the Companies Act 1928.

Section 188
This section was repealed by section 118(3) of, and the Third Schedule to, the Companies Act 1928.

Section 190
This section was repealed by section 118(3) of, and the Third Schedule to, the Companies Act 1928.

Section 198
This section was repealed by section 118(3) of, and the Third Schedule to, the Companies Act 1928.

Section 212
Re Parkes Garage (Swadlincote) Ltd [1929] 1 Ch 139 was decided under this section.

Section 217
This section was repealed by section 118(3) of, and the Third Schedule to, the Companies Act 1928.

Section 218
This section was repealed by section 17 of, and the Schedule to, the Perjury Act 1911.

Section 238
The words "and fees" in section 238(1), so far as they related to the High Court, were repealed by section 29(4) of, and the Fifth Schedule to, the Administration of Justice Act 1925.

Section 274
Section 274(3) was repealed by section 118(3) of, and the Third Schedule to, the Companies Act 1928.

Section 281
The words  "on conviction on indictment to imprisonment for a term not exceeding two years, with or without hard labour, and" and the words "in either case" were repealed by section 17 of, and the Schedule to, the Perjury Act 1911.

Schedule 2
This Schedule was repealed by section 118(3) of, and the Third Schedule to, the Companies Act 1928.

See also
Companies Act

References
D G Hemmant. The Companies (Consolidation) Act, 1908. Jordan & Sons. Third Edition. 1909. Fourth Edition. 1910.
The Companies Acts, 1908 and 1913. Fifth Edition. 1914.
L Worthington Evans and F Shewell Cooper. Notes on the Companies (Consolidation) Act, 1908. Charles Knight. 1909. Google
Herbert William Jordan. A B C Guide to the Companies (Consolidation) Act, 1908. Seventh Edition. 1910.
Company Law and Practice: An Alphabetical Guide Thereto. Twelfth Edition. 1915.
Henry Burton Buckley, Baron Wrenbury. The Law and Practice under the Companies (Consolidation) Act, 1908, and the Limited Partnerships Act, 1907. Ninth Edition. Stevens and Haynes. 1909.
The Law and Practice under the Companies Acts. . Stevens. 1924.
Great Britain - Companies (Consolidation) Act, 1908. Printed for Interstate Commerce Committee. Washington. 1911. Google
Francis Beaufort Palmer. Company Precedents: for use in relation to Companies subject to the Companies (Consolidation) Act, 1908. Eleventh Edition. Stevens. 1912.  
Winding Up Forms and Practice. 
Company Precedents: for use in relation to Companies subject to the Companies Acts, 1908 to 1917. Twelfth Edition. 1920 to 1922.   
The Companies (Consolidation) Act 1908 and the Companies Acts 1913-1917. Seventh Edition. Solicitors Law Stationery Society. 1925.
Francis Beaufort Palmer. Company Law:  A Practical Handbook for Lawyers and Business Men. Stevens & Sons. Eighth Edition. 1910. Tenth Edition. 1916. Eleventh Edition. 1921. Twelfth Edition. 1924.
Arthur Stiebel. Company Law and Precedents. First Edition. Butterworth & Co. 1912. Second Edition. 1920.
Topham. Principles of Company Law. Third Edition. 1910. Fourth Edition. 1914.
William Frederick Hamilton and Percy Tindal-Robertson. Company Law. Third Edition. W R Percival Parker. Canadian Edition. 1911.
John Ashton Cross. Limited Liability Companies: The Law and Practice with the Cases and Precedents, to which are appended the Companies (Consolidation) Act 1908 . . . Simpkin, Marshall, Hamilton, Kent. 1912. Google.
"Companies (Consolidation) Act". The Practical Statutes of the Session 1908. Law Times Office. 1909. Pages 647 to 902. 
Aggs. "Companies (Consolidation) Act, 1908". Chitty's Statutes of Practical Utility. Sweet and Maxwell. Sixth Edition. 1911. Volume 2. Pages 524 to 675.
Halsbury's Statutes of England. (The Complete Statutes of England). First Edition. 1929. Volume 41.
"Companies under the Companies Act, 1908". Halsbury's Laws of England. First Edition. Butterworth & Co. London. (Agents for Canada: Canada Law Book Company, Toronto). 1910. Volume 5. Part IV. Pages 33 to 611.
The Yearly County Court Practice 1914. 
Daniell's Chancery Practice. 1914. Volume 2. 
"Companies under the Companies (Consolidation) Act, 1908, and similar Acts". The English and Empire Digest. Title "Companies". Volumes 9 and 10. Part III. 1924. Volume 9. Page 37 onwards. Volume 10. Up to page 1064.
Jenks. A Digest of English Civil Law. Second Edition. 1921. Volume 1.
Maconochie and Ballingall. "Company". The Scots Digest . . . 1905-1915. W Green & Son. Edinburgh. 1915. column 161 et seq.

United Kingdom company law
United Kingdom Acts of Parliament 1908
1900s economic history